Lord Francis Nathaniel Conyngham (24 September 1832 – 14 September 1880) was an Irish politician who sat in the United Kingdom Parliament as a member of parliament.

Background
Conyngham was a younger son of The 2nd Marquess Conyngham and Lady Jane ( Paget), daughter of Field Marshal The 1st Marquess of Anglesey. He served in the Royal Navy and achieved the rank of lieutenant.

Political career
Conyngham was returned to Parliament for County Clare in 1857, a seat he held until 1859 and again between 1874 and 1880.

Personal life
Conyngham married the Hon. Georgiana Charlotte, daughter of The 1st Baron Tredegar, in 1857. There were no children from the marriage. He died in Gloucester, in September 1880, aged 47.

His wife later remarried and died in April 1886.

References

External links 
 
 

1832 births
1880 deaths
Younger sons of marquesses
Members of the Parliament of the United Kingdom for County Clare constituencies (1801–1922)
UK MPs 1857–1859
UK MPs 1874–1880
Royal Navy officers
Francis
Deputy Lieutenants of Donegal